Scaeosopha sabahensis is a species of moth of the family Cosmopterigidae. It is found in Sabah on Borneo.

The wingspan is 13–16.5 mm. The ground colour of the forewings is greyish-white, suffused with black scales. The hindwings are deep-grey.

Etymology
The species name is derived from Sabah, the type locality.

References

Moths described in 2012
Scaeosophinae